Rocky Spring Presbyterian Church is a historic Presbyterian church in Letterkenny Township, Franklin County, Pennsylvania. It was built in 1794, and is a -story, four by six bay, brick Georgian style building.  It measures 48 feet by 60 feet, and has a gable roof.  The interior of the church includes two ten-plate stoves; brick aisle ways; a crude ladder leading to a loft; and wooden pews that are long and narrow with high straight-backed seating.  The ends of the pews are carved with the names of the previous occupants identifying the military ranks they held during the Revolutionary War.  Rocky Springs Church was a pay for pew church that required members to sign a financial agreement between the trustees of the church and the pew holders requiring an annual fee for occupancy of the pew. The Church's pulpit is circular in form and positioned above the pews giving the speaker full view of the congregation.  Access is gained by a staircase.  Above the pulpit is an oval-shaped canopy or sounding board.

Five acres of land to build the church was acquired by warrant on November 6, 1792.  Trustees of the congregation  who acquired the land upon which to build the church included:  George Matthews, Esq.; James McCalmont, Esq.; James Ferguson, Esq.; James Culbertson, Esq.; and Samuel Culbertson.  The property includes the church cemetery, with the oldest grave stone dated to the 1780s.

It was added to the National Register of Historic Places in 1994. Each year the church is opened for an annual Presbyterian service giving the people in attendance an opportunity to experience the austere beauty of the church.

References

External links
History of the Rocky Spring Church : and addresses delivered at the centennial anniversary of the present church edifice, August 23, 1894 (1895)

Churches on the National Register of Historic Places in Pennsylvania
Georgian architecture in Pennsylvania
Churches completed in 1794
18th-century Presbyterian church buildings in the United States
Churches in Franklin County, Pennsylvania
Presbyterian churches in Pennsylvania
National Register of Historic Places in Franklin County, Pennsylvania
1794 establishments in Pennsylvania